Ishkamish District is a district of Takhar Province, Afghanistan.

References

Districts of Takhar Province